Galois geometry (so named after the 19th-century French mathematician Évariste Galois) is the branch of finite geometry that is concerned with algebraic and analytic geometry over a finite field (or Galois field). More narrowly, a Galois geometry may be defined as a projective space over a finite field.

Objects of study include affine and projective spaces over finite fields and various structures that are contained in them. In particular, arcs, ovals, hyperovals, unitals, blocking sets, ovoids, caps, spreads and all finite analogues of structures found in non-finite geometries. Vector spaces defined over finite fields play a significant role, especially in construction methods.

Projective spaces over finite fields

Notation

The geometric dimension in the above notation refers to the system whereby lines are 1-dimensional, planes are 2-dimensional, points are 0-dimensional, etc. The modifier, sometimes the term projective instead of geometric is used, is necessary since this concept of dimension differs from the concept used for vector spaces (that is, the number of elements in a basis). Normally having two different concepts with the same name does not cause much difficulty in separate areas due to context, but in this subject both vector spaces and projective spaces play important roles and confusion is highly likely. The vector space concept is at times referred to as the algebraic dimension.

Construction
Let  denote the vector space of (algebraic) dimension  defined over the finite field . Subspaces are then built up from the points using the definition of linear independence of sets of points.

Subspaces
The projective subspaces are given common geometric names; points, lines, planes and solids are the 0,1,2 and 3-dimensional subspaces, respectively. The whole space is an -dimensional subspace and an -dimensional subspace is called a hyperplane (or prime).

The number of vector subspaces of algebraic dimension  in vector space  is given by the Gaussian binomial coefficient,

Thus, for example, the number of lines ( = 1) in PG(3,2) is 

The number of lines through a point of  can be calculated to be  and this is also the number of hyperplanes through a fixed point.

Let  and  be subspaces of the Galois geometry . The dimensions of the join and intersection of these two subspaces are related by the formula,

Coordinates

A projective point is an equivalence class of vectors, so there are many different coordinates (of the vectors) that correspond to the same point. However, these are all related to one another since each is a non-zero scalar multiple of the others. This gives rise to the concept of homogeneous coordinates used to represent the points of a projective space.

History
Gino Fano was an early writer in the area of Galois geometries. In his article of 1892, on proving the independence of his set of axioms for projective n-space, among other things, he considered the consequences of having a fourth harmonic point be equal to its conjugate. This leads to a configuration of seven points and seven lines contained in a finite three-dimensional space with 15 points, 35 lines and 15 planes, in which each line contained only three points. All the planes in this space consist of seven points and seven lines and are now known as Fano planes. Fano went on to describe Galois geometries of arbitrary dimension and prime orders.

George Conwell gave an early application of Galois geometry in 1910 when he characterized a  solution of Kirkman's schoolgirl problem as a partition of sets of skew lines in PG(3,2), the three-dimensional projective geometry over the Galois field GF(2).
Similar to methods of line geometry in space over a field of characteristic 0, Conwell used Plücker coordinates in PG(5,2) and identified the points representing lines in PG(3,2) as those on the Klein quadric.

In 1955 Beniamino Segre characterized the ovals for q odd. Segre's theorem states that in a Galois geometry of odd order (that is, a projective plane defined over a finite field of odd characteristic) every oval is a conic. This result is often credited with establishing Galois geometries as a significant area of research. At the 1958 International Mathematical Congress Segre presented a survey of results in Galois geometry known up to that time.

See also 

 Incidence geometry

Notes

References

External links 
 Galois geometry at Encyclopaedia of Mathematics, SpringerLink

Finite geometry
Finite fields
Algebraic geometry
Analytic geometry